Jarlath McDonagh (born 1 June 1945) is a Fine Gael politician from County Galway in Ireland.

A former teacher, McDonagh was a senator from 1993 to 2002, elected on the Labour Panel. He was a member of Galway County Council for the Oranmore  electoral area since the 1980s, and retired at the 2014 local elections..

References

1945 births
Living people
Fine Gael senators
Members of the 20th Seanad
Members of the 21st Seanad
Local councillors in County Galway
Politicians from County Galway
Irish schoolteachers